The 2017–18 Penn State Nittany Lions men's ice hockey season was the 12th season of play for the program and the 5th season in the Big Ten Conference. The Nittany Lions represented Pennsylvania State University and were coached by Guy Gadowsky, in his 7th season.

Season
Fresh off of their first tournament appearance, Penn State entered the season looking to improve on their newfound success. Unfortunately, the team had some difficulty finding traction early in the season. The Nittany Lions split each of their first five weekends of the season, progressively declining in the rankings, until they were knocked out altogether by Notre Dame. Peyton Jones, who had played spectacularly as a freshman, was struggling early in his sophomore season and began losing his first grip on the starting role.

In mid-November Penn State began to find their form and began a nearly 2-month unbeaten streak. They jumped back into the top-20 after a 4–0 shoutout against Ohio State that saw Jones seize his primary job in the crease and by mid-January the team had nearly returned to their preseason ranking. Immediately following their run, however, the offense flagged and the team went 8 games without a win. Because that stretch was played almost entirely against ranked teams, PSU wasn't punished too harshly in the standings (ending up at 16), but their hopes at returning to the tournament were balanced on a razor's edge. The team was tied for 5th in the conference entering the final weekend and they were facing a top-10 team in Minnesota. Surprisingly, the Nittany Lions easily handled the Gophers and leapt ahead of Minnesota in the standings, ending up as the 4th seed by just 1 point.

When the conference tournament began, PSU was again facing Minnesota. The team took advantage of their home games and swept the Golden Gophers with a nail-biter in the second match. The four consecutive wins essentially flipped Minnesota and Penn State in the rankings. When the team headed to South Bend the following week they were ranked 12th in the country and all but guaranteed a spot in the tournament regardless of the result. The team performed well against the Fighting Irish but fell 2–3.

Penn State was ranked 12th by the NCAA selection committee and given a #3 seed in the tournament. They opened against Denver as the de facto home team since they were the host for the Midwest Regional. Unfortunately, the team was overwhelmed by the Pioneers; Denver scored the first four goals and outshout the Nittany Lions 42–27 en route to a 5–1 win.

Departures

Recruiting

Roster

As of September 3, 2017.

Standings

Schedule and Results

|-
!colspan=12 style=";" | Exhibition

|-
!colspan=12 style=";" | Regular season

|-
!colspan=12 style=";" | 

|- align="center" bgcolor="#e0e0e0"
|colspan=12|Penn State wins series 2–0

|-
!colspan=12 style=";" |

Scoring Statistics

Goaltending statistics

Rankings

*USCHO did not release a poll in week 1.

Players drafted into the NHL

2018 NHL Entry Draft
No Penn State players were selected in 2018.

References

External links

Penn State Nittany Lions men's ice hockey seasons
Penn State Nittany Lions
Penn State Nittany Lions
2017 in sports in Pennsylvania
2018 in sports in Pennsylvania